Church of Anthrax is a collaborative studio album by musicians John Cale and Terry Riley. It was released in February 1971 by record label CBS, nearly a year after the material was recorded. It followed Riley's success with 1969's A Rainbow in Curved Air and Cale's influential work with the Velvet Underground.

The album was reissued and remastered in 2014.

Music 
The album blends "Riley's drones and patterns with a more muscular and melodic bent versed in both free jazz and experimental rock." Rolling Stone labeled it "largely stretched-out organ-heavy improvisations, a freak-out in slow motion." The album was mostly improvised on the spot, using two drummers, Bobby Gregg and Bobby Colomby. "The Soul of Patrick Lee" is the only vocal track on the album; all others are instrumentals. No singles were taken from the album.

Terry Riley noted that "John Cale and I had a lot of disagreements about the album, including the way it should sound and the way the material should go. During the last mixing session, John started feeding in a lot of extra guitar tracks over what we had done. That started to obscure some of my keyboard work that I thought should be heard. We had a disagreement about that, so I stopped going to the mixing sessions and they mixed it without me." However, in retrospect he stated that "over time, I’ve grown to like what they did."

In the early 1990s, the duo reunited in New York to record a Church of Anthrax II, but nothing materialized after it became clear that Cale only wanted to produce rather than perform on the album.

Reception 
Upon release, the album received mixed reception. Rolling Stone called it "one of the finest records to be released this year" but noted that it was largely ignored. Melody Maker described the album as "an uneven record, remarkable for one excellent Cale song ("The Soul of Patrick Lee") and the title track, a brilliantly dense piece of production. Cale's viola and bass and Riley's organ and saxophone create an impenetrable, organic vortex of sound. One of the all-time great headphones tracks, featuring the avant-garde at its funkiest." Robert Christgau of The Village Voice described it as "an album of keyboard doodles posing as improvisations."

Following its reissue in 2014, the Irish Times noted that the album was initially regarded as an "unsatisfying concoction between two motivating forces in the avant-garde," but suggested that "for those who like their minimalism spiked with broken glass (notably "Ides of March"), perhaps it’s time to open the door and walk down the aisle." Record Collector stated that the album "walked the thin line between boundary-pushing experimentation and indulgent jamming, only reaching a cathartic breakthrough on "The Hall of Mirrors in the Palace of Versailles"' shimmering collision between Cale’s piano and Riley’s tape-delayed soprano sax." The New York Times called it "an art-rock touchstone."

Track listing

Personnel 

 John Cale – bass guitar, harpsichord, piano, guitar, viola, organ
 Terry Riley – piano, organ, soprano saxophone

 Additional personnel

 Adam Miller – vocals on "The Soul of Patrick Lee"
 Bobby Colomby – drums
 Bobby Gregg – second drums

 Technical personnel
 Don Meehan – engineering
 John Berg, Richard Mantel – cover design
 Kim Whitesides – cover art
 Don Huntstein – cover photography

References

External links 

 

John Cale albums
Terry Riley albums
1971 albums
Albums produced by John Cale
Columbia Records albums
Albums produced by Terry Riley